Dixmude (L9015) is an amphibious assault ship, a type of helicopter carrier, of the French Navy.

Dixmude was delivered to the French defence procurement agency on 3 January 2012, three months ahead of schedule.

Service history
In January 2013, Dixmude took part in Operation Serval, ferrying elements of the 92ème Régiment d'Infanterie to Mali.

In April 2016, it was announced she would be part of the Anglo-French military exercise CJEX.

In July 2018, the ship docked in Haifa port, Israel for a joint exercise with the Israeli Navy.

In April 2020, the ship operated as part of a joint British, French and Dutch naval task force in response to the COVID-19 pandemic, in overseas territories in the Caribbean. RFA  was also present as the UK's commitment to supporting British Overseas Territories along with HMS Medway as the Caribbean guard ship.

In February 2023, Dixmude was tasked to initiate an around the world deployment accompanied by the frigate . The deployment was to involve a series of exercises and port calls en route, including at several French overseas territories. For the deployment, Dixmude embarked one of the new EDA-S landing craft, along with one EDA-R and one CTM landing craft.

References

Further reading
</ref>

Mistral-class amphibious assault ships
Amphibious warfare vessels of France
2010 ships
Ships built in France